Eleanor Oldroyd (born in Bury, Lancashire, 2 June 1962) is a British sports broadcaster with BBC Radio.

Early life
Oldroyd was educated at Oxford High School and Girton College at Cambridge University.

Broadcasting career
Beginning her career in commercial radio, Oldroyd joined BBC Radio Shropshire as a Sports Producer in 1986 before moving to London in 1988.

She worked at Newsbeat and then at BBC Sport,  reporting and presenting on both Radio 5 and 5 Live.

She first hosted the Sunday afternoon sports show in 1993. In 1995, she became the first female presenter of Sports Report (since it started in 1948) when she stood in for Ian Payne.

She is a regular on 5 Live's Fighting Talk – known as the "First Lady of Fighting Talk" – and hosts several weekly 5 Live shows including Saturday Breakfast (with Chris Warburton), the evening 5 Live Sport programme and the Friday Sports Panel.

She covers the Wimbledon tennis championships and was part of the Test Match Special team from 2000 to 2005.
 
She led the station's coverage of the 2014 Winter Olympics from Sochi.

She was named the Sports Journalists' Association Broadcast Presenter of the Year for 2014  and 2016 

Following the death of His Royal Highness, Prince Philip, Duke of Edinburgh, she led the coverage of his funeral, sat in a small, specially built studio above the high altar. She was the only reporter or broadcaster present in St Georges Chapel on the day of his funeral.

Personal life
Oldroyd was formerly married to fellow BBC sports presenter Nick Mullins and has two children.

She supports Arsenal despite coming from a family of Birmingham City fans.

References

External links
 Saturday Breakfast (BBC Radio 5 Live)
 Sunday Breakfast (BBC Radio 5 Live)
 Biography
 BBC Sport Website blog

1962 births
Living people
BBC sports presenters and reporters
BBC Radio 5 Live presenters
Women sports announcers
British radio personalities
People educated at Oxford High School, England
People from Bury, Greater Manchester
British women radio presenters